Della Cheryl Warrior (born 1946) is the first and only woman to date to serve as the chairperson and chief executive officer for the Otoe-Missouria Tribe. She later served at the president of the Institute of American Indian Arts, finding a permanent home for the institution as well as helping to raise over one hundred million dollars for the institution over a twelve-year period. Warrior was inducted into the Oklahoma Women's Hall of Fame in 2007.

Early life
Della Cheryl Hopper was born in 1946 in Pawnee, Oklahoma, and grew up in Red Rock, Oklahoma, with her mother and stepfather. The family moved around frequently, allowing Warrior to have the opportunity to live in cities such as Shawnee, Tulsa, Oklahoma City, Enid, Ponca City, Dallas, Wichita, and Los Angeles. Warrior began her education at Pawnee Indian School and averaged approximately two schools per year up until about sixth grade. During her high school years, Warrior attended six different schools.

Education
After graduation, Warrior left to attend Northeastern State University in Tahlequah, Oklahoma, with the intention on pursuing a medical degree. The summer before her junior year, Warrior attended a workshop at the University of Colorado. This experience broadened her pride for her native heritage and sparked her interest in that field. Her junior year she changed her major to sociology due to finances and graduated with her bachelor's in 1966.

Warrior went and received her master's degree in education from Harvard University in 1971.

Career
Directly out of college, Warrior became the director of social services for Head Start for six counties in Kansas.
Later on in 1971, she became the director of Indian education for Albuquerque schools and served until 1987. The district contained 117 schools with roughly 3,300 Indian students from over 100 tribes.
She became the first and only (to date) female Chairman of the Otoe-Missouria Tribe from 1989–1992. In this position, Warrior dealt with issues of roads/transportation, environmental concerns, as well as health and public safety.
From 1993 to 1998, Warrior served IAIA as the director of developing and acting director of development.
In 1998, Warrior became the president of the Institute of American Indian Arts (IAIA) and served in this role until 2006. She established a permanent campus for the institution after a 38-year period of temporary housing. Warrior increased funding by three hundred percent, helping to raise over one hundred million dollars over a 12-year time period.

In June 2013, Della Warrior was selected as the new director of the New Mexico Museum of Indian Arts and Culture (MIAC), becoming the first woman and the first Native American to serve as the museum's director. She retired in 2021, having created a significant expansion of the education department and remote programs, and having overseen more than 30 exhibitions, including the revision of the core exhibit Here, Now and Always which is slated to open in 2022.

Following retirement from MIAC, Della Warrior became president and CEO of the Multi-Indigenous Initiative for Community Advancement (The MICA Group), an organization she founded with Wilma Mankiller in 2006 and which recently administered the $10 million Cultural Resource Fund for cultural heritage preservation projects for tribes and tribal communities.

Personal life
Hopper married Clyde Warrior (1939–1968) of the Ponca Tribe of Indians of Oklahoma in 1965. They had two daughters: Mary Martha Warrior and Andrea Immogene Warrior.

Achievements and service
Other roles that Warrior has filled include:

 Consultant for Ponca Tribal bingo
 Consultant for Andrew Skeeter, Inc.
 Consultant for Tulsa Indian Health Care Resource Center
 Advisor to the American Indian Culture Museum
 Board member of Wings of America
 Board member of National Museum of the American Indian
 Board member of the Smithsonian Institution
 National Organization of Native American Women volunteer
 Ponca Tribe of Oklahoma volunteer
 Appointee to President George Bush's Board of Advisors on Tribal Colleges and Universities
 Charter member of World Indigenous Nations Higher Education Consortium

Awards
 Paul Harris Fellow from Rotary International (2000)
 Named Woman of the Year by the Albuquerque YWCA (2002)
 Oklahoma Women's Hall of Fame inductee (2007) 
 Lifetime Achievement Award from the Association of Tribal Libraries, Archives, and Museums (2018)

References

External links
 Oklahoma Women’s Hall of Fame Oral History Project – OSU Library

Harvard Graduate School of Education alumni
Native American activists
Otoe people
Native American leaders
1946 births
Living people
American women chief executives
Northeastern State University alumni
People from Pawnee, Oklahoma
21st-century Native American women
21st-century Native Americans